Kiss Me Goodbye may refer to:
 "Kiss Me Goodbye" (Petula Clark song), a 1968 song by Petula Clark
 "Kiss Me Goodbye" (Buck Tick song), a 1990 song by Buck-Tick
 "Kiss Me Good-Bye", a 2006 song by Angela Aki, used as the ending theme song for Final Fantasy XII
 "Kiss Me Goodbye", a 2020 Eric Ethridge song from the album Good With Me
 Kiss Me Goodbye (film), a 1982 film